Kotamaraju Rama Rao (9 November 1896 – 9 March 1961) was an Indian editor, freedom fighter, and also served as  a member of Rajya Sabha.

He was the first editor of The National Herald (India).  He was jailed in August 1942 by the British government for his editorial titled "Jail or Jungle" criticizing the torture of Satyagrahis in Lucknow camp jail.  He was elected to the first Rajya Sabha from the state of Madras in 1952.

The Indian post office issued a stamp in 1997 to celebrate his birth centenary. 

He also authored his own autobiography titled The Pen As My Sword.

References

1896 births
1953 deaths
Place of birth missing
Place of death missing